Peter Joseph Brennan (September 23, 1936 – June 8, 2012) was an American basketball player.

Early life
Brennan was born in Brooklyn, New York.  He played collegiately for the University of North Carolina, where he was chosen ACC Men's Basketball Player of the Year in the 1957–58 season.

Career
He was selected by the New York Knicks in the first round (4th pick overall) of the 1958 NBA Draft. He played for the Knicks (1958–59) in the NBA for 16 games.

Honors
He was inducted into the North Carolina Sports Hall of Fame in 2007.

Death
Brennan died of prostate cancer on June 8, 2012 in Durham, North Carolina.

References

External links

1936 births
2012 deaths
Basketball players from New York City
All-American college men's basketball players
American men's basketball players
Deaths from prostate cancer
New York Knicks draft picks
New York Knicks players
North Carolina Tar Heels men's basketball players
Small forwards
Sportspeople from Brooklyn
Deaths from cancer in North Carolina